"Well Thought Out Twinkles" is a song by American rock band Silversun Pickups. The song was released as the third single from the band's debut album Carnavas, peaking at no. 9 on the Billboard Modern Rock Tracks chart.

Reception
In his review of Carnavas, Carlos Grischow of IGN selected "Well Thought Out Twinkles" as a highlight, saying the song " has claws that make a valiant effort to rip a hole through your soul." Rolling Stone favorably compared the song to the Smashing Pumpkins, highlighting the vocals of Brian Aubert and Nikki Monninger. Pitchfork was more negative, calling the lyrics "wholly incomprehensible."

Music video
The song's music video was directed by Philip Andelman. The video, shot mostly in black and white, shows the band performing the song.

Track listing

Charts

References

External links
Official Music Video at YouTube

Silversun Pickups songs
2006 songs
2007 singles
Dangerbird Records singles